Canfield Street is a QLine streetcar station in Detroit, Michigan. The station opened for service on May 12, 2017, and is located in Midtown Detroit. The station services the northern Cass Corridor, Detroit Medical Center, and Cultural Center neighborhoods.

Destinations
 Detroit Medical Center
 Wayne State University
 The Whitney
 Museum of Contemporary Art Detroit

Station
The station is sponsored by Compuware on the southbound side and by JPMorgan Chase on the northbound side. It is heated and features security cameras and emergency phones. Passenger amenities include Wi-Fi and arrival signs.

See also

Streetcars in North America

References

Tram stops of QLine
Railway stations in the United States opened in 2017